Carter Lane Burgess (December 31, 1916 – August 18, 2002) was an American soldier, business executive, and diplomat.

Life

He graduated from Virginia Military Institute. He served in World War II, as an assistant to Dwight D. Eisenhower. From September 24, 1954, to January 22, 1957, he was  Assistant Secretary of Defense (Manpower and Personnel). From January 1957 to January 1958, he was president of Trans World Airlines. In 1958, he was president of American Machine and Foundry. Also in 1958 he was  appointed to the President's Council on Youth Fitness. In 1968 he was appointed ambassador to Argentina. Burgess also served as Chairman of the National Corporation of Housing Partnerships and the National Center for Housing Management.

Family 
In 1941, he married May Gardner Burgess. She died in 1990.

References

1916 births
2002 deaths
American diplomats
United States Army personnel of World War II
United States Army officers
20th-century American diplomats
American expatriates in Argentina